Hosszúaszó is the Hungarian name for two villages in Romania:

 Valea Lungă Commune, Alba County
 Hosasău village, Leliceni Commune, Harghita County